This is a list of teams and cyclists for the 2005 Vuelta a España.

2005 Vuelta a España
2005